Mónica Spear Mootz (1 October 1984 – 6 January 2014) was a Venezuelan actress, model and beauty pageant titleholder who won Miss Venezuela 2004. She also represented Venezuela at Miss Universe 2005 in Bangkok, Thailand where she finished as 4th runner-up.

Pageantry

Miss Venezuela 2004
During the Miss Venezuela 2004 pageant, Spear won the national crown and represented Venezuela at Miss Universe 2005 in Thailand.

Miss Universe 2005
Spear made the top 15 after Ana Karina Áñez (Miss Venezuela 2003) failed to make the top 15 in Miss Universe 2004, which was the first time in 22 years that Venezuela failed to place. Spear went on to place in the Top 5 after the evening gown and swimsuit competitions. During the final question round, she stumbled while answering the question given by Miss Mexico, Laura Elizondo, and eventually finished as 4th runner-up.

Personal life
Mónica Spear Mootz was born to Rafael Spear Tudares and Ingeborg Mootz Gotera. Her maternal family emigrated from Germany, and her paternal family has English ancestry.

The Spear–Mootz family moved to Orlando, Florida in 2000 after her mother, Ingeborg, retired from her job with an oil company in Venezuela. Her father, Rafael, is a project engineer at Siemens Westinghouse. Prior to being named the fifth runner-up in the Miss Universe pageant Spear completed a bachelor's degree in theater from the University of Central Florida before returning to Venezuela to compete in the national pageant. Her participation in Miss Venezuela garnered notoriety when she was asked during the traditional "breakfast with press" the day after the pageant, because of her degree, which Venezuelan playwright she liked the most, to which she answered, "Gabriel García Márquez", a Colombian writer. She crowned her Miss Venezuela successor, Jictzad Viña, on 15 September 2005.

Spear married a British businessman, Thomas Henry Berry (whose nationality was later misidentified as Irish) in June 2008. She gave birth to a daughter later that year. The couple divorced in 2012, but remained friendly, and at the time of their death they were attempting to reconcile. She was a naturalized United States citizen, resident in Miami, Florida. She is a cousin of Jossie Nikita Marques Spear, a Venezuelan model. Spear was fluent in Spanish, English and French.

Professional life
After modeling, Mother Agency Mariela Centeno, Spear became one of the most successful actresses in Venezuela for her main roles in telenovelas. Her first role as a protagonist was in the RCTV telenovela Mi Prima Ciela (My Cousin Ciela), in which she played a high-school student battling leukemia. The show was a success in Venezuela and other parts of South America, and it was televised in the US by TeleFutura. Spear held the starring role in Venevisión's telenovela La Mujer Perfecta in 2010, and recently had a lead role in Flor Salvaje; a Spanish language telenovela produced by the Miami-based television network Telemundo and RTI Producciones. She had lived in Miami since she began working for Telemundo.

Venezuelan channel Venevisión broadcast La Mujer Perfecta in honor of Spear and a foundation aid for people with Asperger syndrome. Same television special will Mónica Spear, led by the former Miss Venezuela, cheerleader and actress Mariangel Ruiz.

Death
On 6 January 2014, Spear was in her native Venezuela on vacation with her ex-husband and their five-year-old daughter. While inside their car waiting for assistance after the vehicle had broken down on a highway in central Carabobo, Spear and her ex-husband were killed during an attempted robbery and their daughter shot and wounded in the leg. The police reported that the incident occurred around 9 or 10 p.m. It has been theorized that the thieves tried to rob them and the couple resisted.

On the initial suggestion that her former husband was Irish, the Irish Department of Foreign Affairs was investigating the incident. However, local police said he was travelling on a British passport. The international media also highlighted the rising rate of crime in Venezuela.

Investigation and aftermath

On 8 January 2014, seven people were arrested by the Cuerpo de Investigaciones Científicas, Penales y Criminalísticas (CICPC) for their alleged involvement in the murder. The suspects were José Ferreira Herrera (18), Jean Carlos Colina (19), Nelfrend Jiménez Álvarez (21), Alejandro Maldonado Pérez (21), Franklin Cordero Álvarez (28), Leonar Marcano Lugo (32) and Eva Armas Mejías (39). At the time of the arrest, the Venezuelan authorities also confiscated several items believed to have been owned by Spear and Berry.

Spear's daughter has been in the care of her grandparents since her parents' death. Nicolás Maduro, the President of Venezuela, provided a private jet to fly Spear's parents from Florida to Venezuela so they could be with their granddaughter.

After two years, six of the people that were involved in their murder have received sentences. Three men were each sentenced to more than 30 years in prison. Eva Armas Mejias received a 10-year sentence because she was found to be the accomplice. Four other people involved received sentences between 24 and 26 years for the murder of Monica Spear and her ex-husband.

Filmography

Awards and nominations

See also
List of Miss Venezuela titleholders
List of Miss Venezuela Special Awards

References

External links
Mónica Spear on Twitter
Miss Venezuela Official Page

1984 births
2014 deaths
Deaths by firearm in Venezuela
Miss Universe 2005 contestants
Miss Venezuela winners
People from Carabobo
People from Maracaibo
People murdered in Venezuela
University of Central Florida alumni
Venezuelan beauty pageant winners
Venezuelan emigrants to the United States
Venezuelan female models
Venezuelan murder victims
Venezuelan people of English descent
Venezuelan people of German descent
Venezuelan telenovela actresses
2014 murders in Venezuela
Violence against women in Venezuela